Love Decade (a.k.a. Decadance) were an English electronic music group that was formed in 1991 by producer Peter Gill, who did the production and writing on the singles that were released during its brief career. Among its members in this project included vocalist Jerome Stokes (who would later record with N-Trance as their lead vocalist), MC Chris O'Brien, and dancers Dave Shaw and Rob Van Winkelen.

The song "So Real" (on which Jerome Stokes sang lead vocals) is the group's highest charting single on the UK Singles Chart, peaking at number 14 and earning the act a performance on Top of the Pops in 1991, where Stokes sang live. The act's second single (and its only video for), "I Feel You", would feature the vocals of an up-and-coming artist named Abigail, who was credited on the single as Gail.

Singles
"Dream On (Is This a Dream)" (1991) - UK #52
"So Real" (1991) - UK #14
"I Feel You" (featuring Gail) (1992) - UK #34
"When the Morning Comes" (1992) - UK #69
"Is This a Dream '96" (1996) - UK #39

References

External links
"So Real" from Top of the Pops (1991)
"I Feel You" music video (1992)

English dance music groups
English house music groups
English electronic music groups
British Eurodance groups
Musical groups established in 1991
Musical groups from Manchester
Remixers
All Around the World Productions artists